V357 Muscae  was a bright nova (Nova Muscae 2018) in the constellation Musca.  It was discovered on January 14, 2018 by Rob Kaufman of Bright, Victoria, Australia with a magnitude of 7.0.

As well as being observed optically, the nova was also detected at radio wavelengths using the Australia Telescope Compact Array.

See also
 List of novae in the Milky Way galaxy

References

Sources
 PNV J11261220-6531086: nova (7 mag) in Musca (discovered by Rob Kaufman)
 CBAT "Transient Object Followup Reports"
 CBET 4472 "NOVA MUSCAE 2018" (access limited)
 "Alert Notice 609: Nova Muscae 2018 - PNV J11261220-6531086"

Novae
20180114
Musca (constellation)
Muscae, V357